Ingeborg Schwalbe (born 21 November 1935) is a German former athlete. She competed in the women's javelin throw at the 1964 Summer Olympics.

References

External links
 

1935 births
Living people
Athletes (track and field) at the 1964 Summer Olympics
German female javelin throwers
Olympic athletes of the United Team of Germany
People from Bautzen (district)
Sportspeople from Saxony